3D Space Wars is a video game published by Hewson Consultants for the ZX Spectrum in 1983. It is the first game in the Seiddab Trilogy.

Development and release
Steve Turner wrote 3D Space Wars and it took about five months to develop, and this was his first game. 3D Space-Wars was released in 1983 by Hewson Consultants.

Gameplay
3D Space Wars is a shoot 'em up in which the player has taken command of the world's last fighter-killer spacecraft and must prevent the destruction of civilization by the Seiddab. The game begins with the enemy massed in front of the player and attacking. The player has a cockpit view, and the ship instruments are below the viewscreen, including fuel, speed, and a galaxy map showing the Seiddab positions. Twin lasers fire perspective beams which meet in the center of the crosshairs.  There are refueling points in space which the player will need to locate.  Each successive wave of attackers is more destructive than the last.

The display is in black and white.  Each attack wave consists of 24 aliens, and the player has only two opportunities to refuel during each wave. Speed can be adjusted to one of eight settings, which affects maneuverability, aiming weapons, and how often the ship is hit.

Reception
Crash gave the game an overall rating of 68% and said "A lot of playing appeal but I didn't think there was quite enough going on in the end to make it totally addictive to play."

Personal Computer Games said "3D Space Wars is definitely one of the better shoot-'em up games on the Dragon. The sound isn't too bad, and the graphics give a convincing impression of deep-space duelling. A worthwhile romp through the universe for those with time (and Seiddabs) to kill."

John Scriven for Dragon User said "Although the combined forces of the baddies, oops, Sieddab raiders, is always more than mortal man can face, Hewson Consultants have produced an excellent game that forces you to send the rest of the family away while you turn up the tv volume and lose yourself in inter-galactic battles. Definitely my favourite game of the month."

Your Computer gave the game 3 stars and said "An excellent Dragon game [...] Once again, there is some very good stuff around for the Dragon."

Games Computing said "Overall, it was a well-written game but I am a bit tired of "shoot 'em up" games. I became bored usually after I had scored 120 but to the space-invader game fanatic it is a good game."

Reviews
Allt om Hemdatorer
ASM (Aktueller Software Markt) - Sep, 1986
Micro 7 - Jun, 1984

References

1983 video games
Dragon 32 games
Hewson Consultants games
Shoot 'em ups
Video games developed in the United Kingdom
Video games set in outer space
ZX Spectrum games
ZX Spectrum-only games